

144001–144100 

|-id=096
| 144096 Wiesendangen ||  || Wiesendangen, Switzerland, home of the discoverer Markus Griesser and his family || 
|}

144101–144200 

|-bgcolor=#f2f2f2
| colspan=4 align=center | 
|}

144201–144300 

|-id=296
| 144296 Steviewonder || 2004 DF || Stevie Wonder (born 1950) is the stage name of Stevland Hardaway Morris. He is a blind American songwriter, singer and multi-instrumentalist. He has recorded more than 30 U.S. top ten hits and received 25 Grammy Awards. || 
|}

144301–144400 

|-id=303
| 144303 Mirellabreschi ||  || Mirella Breschi (born 1940), wife of the Italian amateur astronomer Giancarlo Fagioli who co-discovered this minor planet || 
|-id=333
| 144333 Marcinkiewicz ||  || Ekhard Marcinkiewicz (born 1928), Austrian amateur solar astronomer (Src) || 
|-id=362
| 144362 Swantner ||  || William H. Swantner (born 1943), an American optical engineer, instrumental for the construction of the imaging system used at the Jornada Observatory in Las Cruces, New Mexico, where this minor planet was discovered. || 
|-id=386
| 144386 Emmabirath ||  || Emma M. Birath (born 1974) is a data analyst at Southwest Research Institute Boulder, Colorado. She built instrument software sequences for the New Horizons Mission to Pluto. || 
|}

144401–144500 

|-id=496
| 144496 Reingard ||  || Reingard Apitzsch (born 1947), wife of the German discoverer Rolf Apitzsch || 
|}

144501–144600 

|-id=552
| 144552 Jackiesue ||  || Jackie Sue Holmes (born 1959), wife of American amateur astronomer Robert Holmes who discovered this minor planet. She is active in the business component of the Astronomical Research Institute  in Illinois. || 
|}

144601–144700 

|-id=633
| 144633 Georgecarroll ||  || George Carroll (1902–1983), American builder of precision instruments, heliostats, and telescopes. This minor planet was discovered using one of his telescopes at the Stony Ridge Observatory, California. || 
|-id=692
| 144692 Katemary || 2004 GC || Katelyn Anne Marie Young (born 1999), granddaughter of the American astronomer James Whitney Young who discovered this minor planet || 
|}

144701–144800 

|-id=716
| 144716 Scotttucker ||  || Scott Robert Tucker (born 1978) is a Tucson-based, self-trained optical designer and fabricator of telescopes and astronomical instruments. He is also an experienced astrophotographer and astronomy communicator. || 
|-id=752
| 144752 Plunge || 2004 HK || The Lithuanian town of Plungė, native town of Elena Petreikytė-Černienė, a former teacher of astronomy and wife of astronomer Kazimieras Černis who co-discovered this minor planet || 
|-id=769
| 144769 Zachariassen ||  || Rayan Zachariassen (born 1963), a Canadian computer scientist || 
|}

144801–144900 

|-bgcolor=#f2f2f2
| colspan=4 align=center | 
|}

144901–145000 

|-id=907
| 144907 Whitehorne ||  || Mary Lou Whitehorne, Canadian second vice-president of the Royal Astronomical Society of Canada (Src) || 
|}

References 

144001-145000